There were four primary kinds of taxation in ancient Rome: a cattle tax, a land tax, customs, and a tax on the profits of any profession. These taxes were typically collected by local aristocrats. The Roman state would set a fixed amount of money each region needed to provide in taxes, and the local officials would decide who paid the taxes and how much they paid. Once collected the taxes would be used to fund the military, create public works, establish trade networks, stimulate the economy, and to fund the cursus publicum.

Types 
The ancient Romans had two classes of taxes: the tributa and the vectigalia. Tributa included the tributum soli (a land tax) and the tributum capitis (a poll tax). The vectigalia consisted of four kinds of tax: the portoria (poll tax), the vicesima hereditatium (inheritance tax), the vicesima liberatis (postage tax), and the centesima rerum venalium (auction sales tax). Cities may have occasionally levied other taxes; however, they were usually temporary. In ancient Rome there was no income tax, instead the primary tax was the portoria. This tax was imposed on goods exiting or entering the city. The size of the tax was based on the value of the item itself. It was higher on luxurious or expensive items, but lower on basic necessities. It was abolished in 60 BCE as it was no longer needed. The Roman empire's increasing size allowed for the government to procure sufficient funds from tributaries. Roman veterans were exempt from paying the portoria tax. Augustus created the vicesima hereditatium and the centesima. The vicesima was an inheritance tax and the centesima was a sales tax on auctions. Both policies were unpopular. They were designed to fund the aerarium militare, which was a service that provided money to veterans.  Caligula abolished the centesima rerum venalium on account of its unpopularity. Caracalla granted Roman citizenship to all male residents of the empire, which was likely a method of increasing the taxable population of the empire. Under Constantine, it had become difficult to pay taxes due to the continued debasement of the solidus, increasing the prevalence of payment in kind.

Collection and management

Indiction 

The indiction was a periodic reassessment for agricultural taxes and land taxes used throughout Roman history. During the Roman Republic this easement occurred every five years; later during the empire the cycle lasted 15 years, although in Roman Egypt a 14-year cycle was used. If the emperors made any change to the tax policy it usually occurred at the beginning of these cycles, and at the end it was common for the Emperors to forgive any arrears.

The Chronicon Paschale, a 7th-century Greek Christian chronicle, claims that this system was established in 49 BCE by Julius Caesar, although it is also possible it began in 48 BC. It also may have begun in 58 CE when Nero issued a series of tax reforms. The earliest known event associated with this cycle was in 42 CE, when Claudius established a board of praetors to pursue arrears for it. The cycle in Egypt only lasted fourteen years because in Egypt the liability for the poll tax began at the age of fourteen.

Tax farming 

Tax farming is a financial management technique in which a legal contract assigns the management of a revenue source to a third party while the original holder of the revenue stream receives fixed periodic rents from the contractor. This practice was first developed by the Romans.  Under their system, the Roman State reassigned the power to collect taxes to private individuals or organizations. These private groups paid the taxes for the area, and they used the products and money that could be garnered from the area to cover the outlay. By the time of the Roman Empire these private people or groups had become known as the publicani. Although Augustus limited the power of the publicani significantly, the Roman government assumed control of farming indirect taxes under the Flavian dynasty. By Trajan's reign they controlled the collection of all vectigalia in all regions except Syria, Egypt and Judea.

Administration 

Taxation in ancient Rome was decentralized, with the government preferring to leave the task of collecting taxes to local elected magistrates. Typically these magistrates were wealthy landowners. During the Roman Republic finances were stored inside the temple of Saturn. Under the reign of Augustus a new institution was created: the fiscus. At first it only contained the wealth gained through taxes on Egypt; but it expanded to other sources later in Roman history. It also collected wealth from people who died without a will, half of the wealth of unclaimed property, and fines. The censors were a political position in ancient Rome that helped manage taxation. The results of their periodic census determined the amount of tax a citizen owed. They registered the value of each citizen's property, which determined the amount of property tax they had to pay. The censors also participated in tax farming through their auctions. They auctioned off the space of a lustrum to the highest bidder in return for tithes and taxes. Censors also had similar duties to a modern minister of finance. They could impose new vectiglia, sell government land, and manage the budget. Rome had a regressive tax system, which is a tax system in which the tax rate decreases as wealth of the taxpayer increases. In Rome, the upper classes paid the lowest rate of taxes while the lower classes paid the highest rate.

Diocletian 
The emperor Diocletian changed the method of collecting taxes in ancient Rome. He replaced the local optimates with a bureaucracy. He established a new tax system known as the Capitatio-Iugatio to try to combat the rampant inflation of that time. This system combined the land rents, known as iugatio, and the capitatio, which affected individuals. Under this policy, arable land was divided into different regions according to their yield and crop. All land, income, and direct taxes were merged into a single tax. This policy tied the peasantry to their land, and those without land were taxed.

Usage and effects 
The wealth acquired through taxes was used to fund the military, fund public works, establish trade networks, and fund the cursus publicus. The Roman government would set a fixed amount of wealth each region needed to pay in taxes, while the magistrates were tasked with determining who would pay the taxes, and how much they would each pay. However, many taxes, such as those on wheat and grain, were paid in kind, which prevented them from being used to stimulate trade. This is because payment in kind cannot be used as by the government as a currency. Roman taxpayer money was also used to fund other goals. Emperor Julian stopped the city of Corinth from taxing the city of Argos, over which they had been given some power, and using that money to fund wild beast hunts. Excessive taxation may also have limited the ability of provinces such as Egypt to provide goods to customers. During earlier Roman history, tax rates were low, likely because the Roman state required little funding in order to perform its duties. This system resulted in much greater local autonomy, often resulting in poor distribution of the tax money. As the Roman empire expanded, it required more resources to maintain itself and continue growing, resulting in an increased level of taxation.

Fall of the Roman Empire 

During the late Roman empire the level of taxation progressively needed to increase as the Roman empire needed to continue funding the military. Most of the responsibility for taxation fell on the lower classes and especially the farmers. By the reign of Diocletian 90 per cent of the government's revenue came from tax on agriculture. This was possibly a major factor in the inability of the empire to adequately man its legions. Bureaucrats used their position of authority to evade taxes, leaving the burden of taxation on the poorer citizens. By now, taxes consumed more than one third of most farmers' gross income. Emperor Constantine refused to place the empire's revenue back into circulation, thus hurting the economy, and forced farmers to sell their goods at low prices due to the emperor's economic policies. Preventing them from gathering the funds necessary to meet the high tax burden. People who were unable to bear this burden would have agreed to become indebted to landlords in exchange for protection, effectively transforming them from free citizens into serfs. The poor flocked to these estates, and as they grew the usage of money became increasingly rarer. This crippled the economy and the ability of the military to gather the necessary funds. The poverty-stricken lower class often turned towards crime. Heavy taxation made the Roman government appear as oppressors, possibly contributing to the loss of provinces such as Africa. Germanic incursions forced the emperors to lower tax rates in the year 413. The government of Rome also decreed that for five years, the tax rate of Italy was reduced by 80 per cent. Despite these reductions, the provinces of Rome struggled to pay their taxes, and the Roman government was unable to receive the funding it needed. Increased levels of inflation reduced the value of the money the government received in taxation. The difficulties in receiving proper tax funds impaired the Roman state's ability to adequately fund the army. Most Late Roman tax money was used to pay off Germanic peoples.

References 

Tax
 
Economy of ancient Rome
Roman law